Don't Forget You're Going to Die is a 1995 French drama film directed, co-written by and starring Xavier Beauvois.

Plot
Benoit (Xavier Beauvois) has planned out his life. Unfortunately he has forgotten about National Service. After he is called up, he tries everything to get around. He goes to a psychiatrist who gives him medicine against depression. As this doesn't work out he tries suicide. The story gets even worse as he is told by a military doctor that he is HIV positive. Benoit tumbles down into the drug scene. Then he goes to Italy and meets Claudia (Chiara Mastroianni). Things seem to improve, but only for a short time...

Cast
 Xavier Beauvois as Benoît
 Chiara Mastroianni as Claudia
 Roschdy Zem as Omar
 Bulle Ogier as Benoît's Mother
 Jean-Louis Richard as Benoît's Father
 Emmanuel Salinger as Military Doctor
 Jean Douchet as Jean-Paul
 Pascal Bonitzer as Psychiatrist
 Cédric Kahn as Benoît's Friend
 Stanislas Nordey as Benoît's Friend
 Patrick Chauvel as Military Commander
 Denis Psaltospoulos as Patient

Soundtrack 
The soundtrack was composed and largely performed by John Cale, and was subsequently released as an album.

Accolades
The film won the Jury Prize at the 1995 Cannes Film Festival.

References

External links 
 

1995 films
1990s French-language films
1995 drama films
French drama films
Films directed by Xavier Beauvois
Films scored by John Cale
1990s French films